The South Extension metro station is a station located on the Pink Line of the Delhi Metro. The station was opened on 6 August 2018. South Extension metro is situated on the Ring Road and metro station will serve both part I and II of South Extension. It also connects the two neighbouring shopping districts of South Extension through a pedestrian overbridge on the inner ring road.

The station

Station layout

Facilities

Entry/Exit

Connections

Bus
Delhi Transport Corporation bus routes number 323, 392, 392B, 433CL, 433LnkSTL, 442, 460, 460CL, 460STL, 479, 479CL, 540, 540ACL, 540CL, 542, 543A, 544, 544A, 567, 567A, 568A, 611, 611A, 623, 623B, 623EXT, 711, 711A, 724C, 727, 874, 984A, AC-479, AC-544, AC-623, AC-711, AC-727
Anand Vihar ISBT Terminal - Gurugram Bus Stand
Anand Vihar ISBT Terminal - Gurugram Bus Stand AC
CS-13A, CS-13B, TMS+Punjabi Baghserves the station.

See also

Delhi
List of Delhi Metro stations
Transport in Delhi
Delhi Metro Rail Corporation
Delhi Suburban Railway
Inner Ring Road, Delhi
South Extension
Delhi Monorail
Delhi Transport Corporation
South Delhi
New Delhi
National Capital Region (India)
List of rapid transit systems
List of metro systems

References

External links

 Delhi Metro Rail Corporation Ltd. (Official site)
 Delhi Metro Annual Reports
 
 UrbanRail.Net – Descriptions of all metro systems in the world, each with a schematic map showing all stations.

Delhi Metro stations
Railway stations in South Delhi district